Governor Penn may refer to:

John Penn (governor) (1729–1795), Governor of Colonial Pennsylvania from 1763 to 1771 and from 1773 to 1776
Richard Penn Sr. (1706–1771), Proprietary and Titular Governor of the Province of Pennsylvania from 1746 to 1771

See also
Dancia Penn (born 1951), Deputy Governor of the British Virgin Islands from 2004 to 2007
Richard Penn (governor) (1730s–1811), Lieutenant Governor of the Province of Pennsylvania from 1771 to 1773